Lippincott may refer to:

Arts and media
 Lippincott's Monthly Magazine a 19th-century literary magazine published in Philadelphia, U.S.
 Andy Lippincott, a fictional character in the comic strip Doonesbury
 "Lippincott", a song by Animals as Leaders from the album The Joy of Motion, 2014

Businesses 

 J. B. Lippincott & Co., an American publishing company founded in 1836 
 Lippincott Williams & Wilkins, successor company, formed in 1998
 Lippincott (brand consultancy), an American brand strategy and design company

People 

 Charles E. Lippincott (1825–1887), American physician and politician
 David McCord Lippincott (1924–1984), American composer and lyricist
 Donald Lippincott (1893–1963), American athlete
 Esther J. Trimble Lippincott (1838—1888), American educator, reformer, author
 Janet Lippincott (1918–2007), American artist
 Joan Lippincott (born 1935), American concert organist and organ professor
 Job H. Lippincott (1842–1900), American lawyer
 Joseph Lippincott, engineer involved in the California Water Wars in the 1900s
 Joshua Lippincott (1835–1906), Chancellor of the University of Kansas 1883–1889
 Joshua Ballinger Lippincott, founder of  J. B. Lippincott & Co.
 His grandson Joseph Wharton Lippincott (1887–1976), American publisher, author, naturalist, and sportsman
 His son Joseph Wharton Lippincott Jr. (1914–2003), American publisher
 Kristen Lippincott, London-based art historian and curator
 Richard Lippincott (Quaker) (1615–1683), English Quaker and an early settler of Shrewsbury, New Jersey
 Richard Lippincott (Loyalist) (1745–1826), an American who fought for the Crown during the American War of Independence
Sara Jane Lippincott (1823–1904), pseudonym Grace Greenwood, American author
Sarah Lee Lippincott (born 1920), American astronomer
Lippincott baronets, a title in the Baronetage of Great Britain
Sir Henry Lippincott, 1st Baronet (1737–1780)

Places 

 Lippincott, Ohio, an unincorporated community
 Lippincott Library, housed in Van Pelt Library of Wharton School of the University of Pennsylvania, U.S.
 Lippincott Mansion, a historic site in Ormond Beach, Florida, U.S.
 John Lippincott House, a historic building in Davenport, Iowa, U.S.
 Lippincott Street, Harbord Village, Toronto, Ontario, Canada

Other uses
 Ellis R. Lippincott Award, an annual award in vibrational spectroscopy
 Gertrude Lippincott Award, an annual award of the Society of Dance History Scholars 
 Lippincott cap, or Ascot cap, a hat

See also
Lippincott Covered Bridge, a historic bridge in Morgan Township, Pennsylvania, U.S.